Rarities Volumes 1 & 2 is a 2014 posthumous double-CD compilation album of various pieces by English experimental musician and composer Lindsay Cooper. It was recorded between 1979 and 1992, and released in the UK and US by RēR Megacorp in 2014. The compilation was also released by ReR Megacorp in Japan in 2015.

Rarities was compiled by Udi Koomran and Chris Cutler in Cooper's honour. It comprises unreleased material, and tracks that had previously appeared only on limited edition releases and compilations.

Background
Cooper died of multiple sclerosis in 2013. She had been diagnosed in 1987, but did not reveal her illness until the late-1990s. Three memorial concerts took place for Cooper in November 2014 in London, West Yorkshire, and Forlì, Italy.

Content
The double-CD compilation booklet includes background information by Chris Cutler, and memorials written by Sally Potter, Tim Hodgkinson, David Thomas and Kate Westbrook.

Reception
In a review of Rarities in Musicworks, René van Peer wrote that the compilation "is a fitting memorial to a creative life that was cruelly cut short by a horrific disease." He said the album highlights Cooper's main interests, the empowerment of women, her opposition to the establishment, and "an irrepressible urge to play, to be heard ... with dedication and focus, and with [a] zest for life." A review of the album at Avant Music News described it as "full of treasures". It stated that while Cooper's work with Henry Cow and News from Babel is well documented, much of her other work is generally not that well known. The reviewer said that this compilation fills those holes, and called it "an excellent introduction to the varied career of the sadly missed Cooper."

Writing in the Czech cultural magazine , Petr Slabý said that the collection of thirty brief pieces on the first disc illustrates Cooper's ability to exploit the short format. He stated that the second disc highlight is the Trio Trabant's Strasbourg concert in which Cooper excels, and called her piano solo on "Piano Roulette", with its variations in tempo and mood, an "unreleased rarity". Overall Slabý was impressed with the compilation, but added that he would have liked to have seen samples of the Feminist Improvising Group and Cooper's collaborative work with Alex Švamberk and Laurie Amat.

In a review in the French webzine, Rythmes Croisés, Stéphane Fougere said that Rarities reveals Cooper's lesser known work, and fills the gaps in her discography. He was particularly impressed by the previously unreleased Trio Trabant concert and Cooper's solo "Piano Roulette", but also would have like to have seen something from the Feminist Improvising Group. Fougere stated that while the material on this compilation is quite diversified, and will appeal to diverse audiences, it should not be seen as a retrospective collection, nor used as an introduction to Cooper's music. He suggested that newcomers start with her solo albums like Rags and The Golddiggers, the Oh Moscow concert, and the two News from Babel albums.

Tracks
All tracks composed by Lindsay Cooper, unless otherwise stated.

Disc 1

Disc 2

Source: CD liner notes

Track notes and personnel

Disc 1
Assembled and pre-mastered by Udi Koomran at Ginger's Studio, Tel Aviv, Israel.

I. Outtakes for Other Occasions
Tracks 1–3 from the 1982 play, The Execution by Melissa Murray
Track 4 from the 1983 film Give Us a Smile by the Leeds Animation Workshop
Tracks 5–8 from the 1983 Channel 4 television documentary, Green Flutes, directed by Nancy Scheisari

Originally released as a limited edition cassette to subscribers to Cooper's Music for Other Occasions (1986)

Recorded in London between 1979 and 1984

Lindsay Cooper – piano, bassoon
Chris Cutler – drums
Maggie Nicols – voice
Irita Kutchmy – flute, saxophone
Vicky Aspinall – violin
Georgie Born – cello on "Trih's Song"
Fred Frith – guitar

II. The Small Screen: Music for Television
Tracks 9–13 from Four Corners, for Channel 4
Tracks 14–17 from the 1983 Channel 4 television documentary, Green Flutes, directed by Nancy Scheisari
Track 18 from Domestic Bliss, a comedy drama directed by Joey Chamberlain for Channel 4
Tracks 19–26 from With Our Children, a film about lesbian mothers directed by Melanie Chait for Channel 4

Originally released as a limited subscription cassette in 1984

Recorded in March 1983 (Green Flutes), March and August 1984 (Four Corners), June 1984 (Domestic Bliss), September 1984 (With Our Children). All engineered by Charles Gray.

Lindsay Cooper – piano, Casio, bassoon, oboe, sopranino and alto saxophones, bass guitar on "Off the Fence" and "Domestic Bliss"
Georgie Born – guitar and bass guitar on "Green Flutes" and "Domestic Bliss"
Chris Cutler – drums on "Green Flutes" and "Domestic Bliss"
Celia Gore Booth – singing saw on "With Our Children"
Dagmar Krause – singing on "Windscale" and "The Number 8 Bus"
Irita Kutchmy – piccolo on "Green Flutes"
Maggie Nicols – singing on "With Our Children"
Kate Westbrook – singing on "The Song of the Goose and the Common", "Off the Fence" and "Fair Exchange"; tenor horn on "Off the Fence", "Fair Exchange" and "With Our Children"

III. Lindsay Cooper and orchestra
Originally released on Angelica 1992 (1993), a compilation by Pierrot Lunaire

Recorded at the Angelica festival, Bologna, Italy in May/June 1992

Lindsay Cooper – soprano saxophone
Orchestra Del Teatro Comunale Di Bologna
Franco Sebastiani – conductor

IV. A Classic Guide to Nomansland
Originally released on the No Man's Land compilation sampler, A Classic Guide To No Man's Land (1988)

Recorded and engineered by Walter Brussow in Frankfurt, Germany, March 1987

Tracks originally written for the films Das Nächste Jahrhundert Wird Unseres Sein and Wir Wollen Lieber Fliegen als Kriechen, directed by Claudia von Allemann for Hessischer Rundfunk television

Elvira Plenar – synthesizer, piano
Lindsay Cooper – sopranino and soprano saxophones
Alfred Harth – bass clarinet
Ann-Marie Roelofs – violin, trombone

Disc 2
Compiled by Chris Cutler and remastered by Bob Drake at Studio Midi-Pyrenees, France.

Trio Trabant
Previously unreleased recordings by the trio of Lindsay Cooper, Alfred 23 Harth, Phil Minton

Recorded at Festival Musica in Strasbourg, Germany on 4 October 1991; mastered by Harth at Laubhuette Studio, Moonsun, Korea

Lindsay Cooper – bassoon, sopranino saxophone, electronics
Alfred 23 Harth – alto and tenor saxophones, clarinet, bass clarinet, trumpet, trombone, piano, synthesizer, Farfisa organ, melodika
Phil Minton – voice

Lindsay Cooper
Originally released as a limited edition not-for-sale subscription item with Cooper's LP Rags

Recorded at Kaleidophon Studios, London in April 1979 for the film Song of the Shirt

Georgie Born – cello, bass guitar
Phil Minton – trumpet, voice
Lindsay Cooper – bassoon, saxophone

Cooper/Cutler/Gilonis/Wyatt
Originally released on The Last Nightingale (1984), released to raise money for the British miners during the 1984–1985 UK miners' strike

Recorded and engineered at Cold Storage in Brixton, London by Gilonis and Tim Hodgkinson, 29–31 October 1984

Lindsay Cooper – piano, electric piano, sopranino saxophone, bassoon
Robert Wyatt – voice
Chris Cutler – drums
Bill Gilonis – guitar, bass

Lindsay Cooper (solo piano)
Previously unreleased

Recorded live at Roulette, New York, 13 November 1985

Lindsay Cooper – piano

David Thomas and the Pedestrians
Originally released on Winter Comes Home (1983)

Recorded live at the Hirschwirt restaurant in Erding, Germany on 11 December 1982; concert mix by EM Thomas

David Thomas – voice
Lindsay Cooper – bassoon, sopranino saxophone
Chris Cutler – drums

Bauer/Cooper/Cutler/Gilonis/Potter
Originally released on Volume 1 No. 1 of the RēR Quarterly magazine (1985)

Recorded at Cold Storage in Brixton, London by Gilonis, April 1984

Lindsay Cooper – piano, alto and soprano saxophone
Sally Potter – voice
Chris Cutler – drums
Connie Bauer – trombone
Bill Gilonis – guitar, bass

Source: CD liner notes

References

External links

2014 compilation albums
Recommended Records compilation albums